The aquatics events at the 2007 Southeast Asian Games included swimming, diving and water polo. The events were held at the Aquatic Center, His Majesty the King's 80th Birthday Anniversary Stadium, Nakhon Ratchasima, Thailand.

Swimming
The Swimming competition was held from 7 to 11 December and featured 32 events.

Participating nations
9 countries competed (team size is number behind country):

Note: There was no participation from Brunei Darussalam and Timor Leste.

Medal tally

Medalists

Men

Women

Diving
The diving events at the 2007 Southeast Asian Games took place at the His Majesty The King's 80th Anniv. Swimming Pool. It was held from 12 December to 15 December 2007. Ten gold medals were contested.

Participating nations

 
 
 
 
 
 

There was no participation from Brunei, Cambodia, Laos, Singapore, and Timor Leste.

Medal tally

Medalists

Men

Women

Water polo
The Water polo events was held from 7 December to 11 December 2007. Six teams were in competition in a round-robin format, with defending champion Singapore retaining its title which it has won 22 times consecutively since 1965, inclusive of the current games.

Participating nations

 
 
 
 
 
 

There was no participation from Brunei Darussalam, Cambodia, Laos, Myanmar and Timor Leste.

Medal tally
 Host nation

Medalists

Round-robin
Standings

Results

See also
List of Southeast Asian Games records in swimming

External links
Southeast Asian Games Official Results

2007 Southeast Asian Games events
2007 in water sports
2007
Swimming competitions in Thailand
Diving in Thailand
International water polo competitions hosted by Thailand